Curramore Sanctuary is a 1.75 km2 nature reserve in south-east Queensland, Australia, 75 km north-north-west of Brisbane on the western edge of the Blackall Range.  It is owned and managed by the Australian Wildlife Conservancy.  It is mainly covered with rainforest and tall eucalypt forest.

Fauna
Notable birds found on Curramore include the grey goshawk, red-browed treecreeper and sooty owl.  Notable mammals include the grey-headed flying-fox.

References

External links
 Australian Wildlife Conservancy

Nature reserves in Queensland
Australian Wildlife Conservancy reserves
2004 establishments in Australia